Patrick Casey (born December 19, 1978) is an American writer, actor, director and author. He often collaborates with writer/director/actor Worm Miller. He is best known for his work on the Fox animated series Golan the Insatiable and the Sonic the Hedgehog feature films.

Filmography

Film
 National Lampoon Presents Dorm Daze (2003)
 Hey, Stop Stabbing Me! (2003) (Also producer)
 Gamebox 1.0 (2004)
 National Lampoon's Dorm Daze 2 (2006)
 Transylmania (2009)
 Shotgun Wedding (2013)
 Sonic the Hedgehog (2020)
 Sonic the Hedgehog 2 (2022)
 Violent Night (2022)
 Sonic the Hedgehog 3 (2024)

Acting roles

Television

References

External links
 
 Amazon.com author page

1978 births
Living people
American male film actors
American male screenwriters
Male actors from Minnesota